Scolecopeltidium is a genus of fungi in the Microthyriaceae family; according to the 2007 Outline of Ascomycota, the placement in this family is uncertain.

Species
As accepted by Species Fungorum;

 Scolecopeltidium allophyli 
 Scolecopeltidium amazonense 
 Scolecopeltidium anthurii 
 Scolecopeltidium batistae 
 Scolecopeltidium cabraliae 
 Scolecopeltidium campomanesiae 
 Scolecopeltidium caseariae 
 Scolecopeltidium caseariicola 
 Scolecopeltidium cassiae 
 Scolecopeltidium cestri 
 Scolecopeltidium chamissoanae 
 Scolecopeltidium chardonii 
 Scolecopeltidium coffeae 
 Scolecopeltidium coloratum 
 Scolecopeltidium connaraceaefolii 
 Scolecopeltidium connari 
 Scolecopeltidium connarusii 
 Scolecopeltidium cordiae 
 Scolecopeltidium crotonis 
 Scolecopeltidium cupaniae 
 Scolecopeltidium cupaniicola 
 Scolecopeltidium cupaniifolium 
 Scolecopeltidium daphnopsidis 
 Scolecopeltidium delitescens 
 Scolecopeltidium djalmae 
 Scolecopeltidium duckei 
 Scolecopeltidium erythroxyli 
 Scolecopeltidium eschweilerae 
 Scolecopeltidium eugeniae 
 Scolecopeltidium garciniae 
 Scolecopeltidium guaduae 
 Scolecopeltidium guettardae 
 Scolecopeltidium guttulatum 
 Scolecopeltidium hormosporum 
 Scolecopeltidium imbe 
 Scolecopeltidium imbeanum 
 Scolecopeltidium ingae 
 Scolecopeltidium ingicola 
 Scolecopeltidium ionopsidis 
 Scolecopeltidium landolphiae 
 Scolecopeltidium lantanae 
 Scolecopeltidium maranhense 
 Scolecopeltidium mayteni 
 Scolecopeltidium menglaense 
 Scolecopeltidium mirabile 
 Scolecopeltidium myrsines 
 Scolecopeltidium myrtacearum 
 Scolecopeltidium nectandrae 
 Scolecopeltidium neeae 
 Scolecopeltidium paypayrolae 
 Scolecopeltidium pedunculatum 
 Scolecopeltidium perae 
 Scolecopeltidium pernambucense 
 Scolecopeltidium philodendricola 
 Scolecopeltidium pithecellobiifolii 
 Scolecopeltidium praeclarum 
 Scolecopeltidium protiicola 
 Scolecopeltidium protiifolii 
 Scolecopeltidium psidii 
 Scolecopeltidium racemosae 
 Scolecopeltidium rosacearum 
 Scolecopeltidium saccoglottidis 
 Scolecopeltidium salacense 
 Scolecopeltidium salaciae 
 Scolecopeltidium sapindi 
 Scolecopeltidium serjaniae 
 Scolecopeltidium smilacis 
 Scolecopeltidium strauchii 
 Scolecopeltidium swartziae 
 Scolecopeltidium swartzianum 
 Scolecopeltidium tabernaemontanae 
 Scolecopeltidium thiloae 
 Scolecopeltidium thiloicola 
 Scolecopeltidium vermiforme 
 Scolecopeltidium wangtianshuiense 
 Scolecopeltidium xylopiae 

Former species;
 S. bakeri  = Micropeltis bakeri, Micropeltidaceae
 S. costi  = Micropeltis costi, Micropeltidaceae
 S. liciniae  = Scolecopeltis liciniae, Micropeltidaceae
 S. multiseptatum  = Micropeltis multiseptata, Micropeltidaceae
 S. transiens  = Scolecopeltis transiens, Micropeltidaceae
 S. xylopiae var. crassum  = Scolecopeltidium xylopiae

References

External links
Index Fungorum

Microthyriales